Do Biran or Dobiran, also spelled Dhuberan or Dow Viran, may refer to:
 Do Biran-e Olya
 Do Biran-e Sofla